Mount Warden is a snow-covered peak, 2,860 m, standing close southeast of Hunt Spur and surmounting a projecting buttress at the northwest face of Watson Escarpment. Mapped by United States Geological Survey (USGS) from surveys and U.S. Navy air photos, 1960–63. Named by Advisory Committee on Antarctic Names (US-ACAN) for Lieutenant George W. Warden, U.S. Navy, pilot on aircraft flights over the Queen Maud Mountains in U.S. Navy Operation Highjump, 1946–47.

Mountains of Marie Byrd Land